Cameron Darcy (born March 2, 1994) is an American professional ice hockey forward. He is currently playing for the Florida Everblades in the ECHL. He was selected in the seventh round, 185th overall, by the Tampa Bay Lightning in the 2014 NHL Entry Draft.

Playing career

Amateur
As a Massachusetts native, Darcy first played high school hockey with Dexter School in Brookline, Massachusetts from 2007 to 2010. Amongst the School's leading scorers he was recruited to join the USA Hockey National Team Development Program, playing two seasons within the USNTDP system and the United States Hockey League (USHL).

Darcy committed to play collegiate hockey with Northeastern University, joining the Huskies as a freshman in the 2012–13 season. He made just 9 appearances with Northeastern before withdrawing from the Northeastern program and returning to the USHL with the Muskegon Lumberjacks on November 14, 2012. In 43 games with the Lumberjacks, Darcy contributed with 12 goals and 31 points.

Junior
Having previously been drafted in the 2011 QMJHL Entry Draft by the Cape Breton Screaming Eagles, Darcy opted to pursue a major junior career signing a contract with the QMJHL club on August 6, 2013. As an alternate captain in his debut season with Cape Breton in 2013–14, Darcy led the team in scoring with 35 goals and 82 points in 65 games, earning a selection to the QMJHL Second All-Star Team.

He was selected by the Tampa Bay Lightning with their last selection in the seventh-round, 185th overall, of the 2014 NHL Entry Draft. He returned to the Screaming Eagles for the 2014–15 season, notching 14 points through 19 games before he was traded to the Sherbrooke Phoenix on December 11, 2014. In his final season in the QMJHL, Darcy posted 45 points in 37 regular season games, before adding 9 points in 6 playoff games in a first-round exit with the Phoenix.

Professional
On April 9, 2015, Darcy was signed by the Lightning to a three-year, entry-level contract. In his first professional year, Darcy was assigned to the Lightning's AHL affiliate, the Syracuse Crunch, to begin the 2015–16 season. In 56 appearances with the Crunch, Darcy was unable to translate his offensive game from junior, posting just 4 goals and 12 points in a depth role.

In the following 2016–17 season, Darcy was limited to just 34 games with the Crunch before he was reassigned to split the season with secondary affiliate, the Kalamazoo Wings of the ECHL. He contributed with over a point-per-game pace with the Wings, collecting 25 points through 20 regular season games.

Before commencing the final season of his entry-level deal with the Tampa Bay Lightning, having been unable to make an impression within the organization, Darcy was placed on unconditional waivers and had his contract terminated on September 19, 2017. As a free agent he agreed to a professional tryout contract with the Utica Comets of the AHL, affiliate to the Vancouver Canucks, leading into the 2017–18 season.  Establishing a role within the Comets, Darcy was signed to an AHL contract for the remainder of the season on November 29, 2017. He recorded career highs with 18 assists and 24 points in 46 games with the Comets leading to a one-year contract extension on June 19, 2018.

In the following 2018–19 season, Darcy solidified his place in the AHL, appearing 68 games with the Comets with a career best 10 goals.

As a free agent from the Comets, Darcy continued his career in the AHL in agreeing to a one-year contract with the San Antonio Rampage, the primary affiliate of the St. Louis Blues on July 1, 2019. In the 2019–20 season, Darcy contributed with 18 points through 45 games before the remainder of the season was cancelled due to the COVID-19 pandemic.

With the Rampage ceasing operations, Darcy as a free agent signed a one-year contract with his fourth AHL club, the Binghamton Devils, on January 12, 2021.

After a years hiatus, Darcy returned to the professional circuit for the 2022–23 season, signing a contract with the Florida Everblades of the ECHL on August 19, 2022.

International play

Darcy was first selected at an international tournament for the United States at the 2011 World U-17 Hockey Challenge, scoring 2 assists in five contests in a silver medal finish. He then competed for the United States in his first full IIHF competition at the 2012 IIHF World U18 Championships, going scoreless in 6 games while claiming the gold medal.

Career statistics

Regular season and playoffs

International

Awards and honors

References

External links

1994 births
Living people
American men's ice hockey centers
Binghamton Devils players
Cape Breton Screaming Eagles players
Florida Everblades players
Kalamazoo Wings (ECHL) players
Muskegon Lumberjacks players
Northeastern Huskies men's ice hockey players
San Antonio Rampage players
Sherbrooke Phoenix players
Syracuse Crunch players
Tampa Bay Lightning draft picks
USA Hockey National Team Development Program players
Utica Comets players